This is a list of members of the National Parliament of Papua New Guinea, as elected at the 2022 election.

Leadership

Members

References

See also 

Papua New Guinea
Lists of members of the National Parliament of Papua New Guinea
2022 establishments in Oceania
2020s in Oceania